Three ships of the United States Navy have borne the name Brooklyn, after the New York City borough of Brooklyn.

 , was a wooden screw sloop commissioned in 1859 and a participant in the American Civil War.
 , was a cruiser commissioned in 1896 and a flagship in the Spanish–American War.
 , was a light cruiser commissioned in 1937 that saw service in World War II and was later transferred to Chile.

See also
Other ships named Brooklyn

References

United States Navy ship names